Events from the year 1936 in France.

Incumbents
President: Albert Lebrun 
President of the Council of Ministers: 
 until 24 January: Pierre Laval
 24 January-4 June: Albert Sarraut
 starting 4 June: Léon Blum

Events
25 March – Second London Naval Treaty is signed by the governments of France, the United Kingdom, and the United States of America.
26 April – Legislative Election held.
3 May – Legislative Election held, resulting in the election of the Popular Front.
26 May – A general strike is initiated in Le Havre.
7 June – Matignon Agreements are signed between the Confédération générale de la production française (CGPF) employers association, the CGT trade union and the French state during a general strike initiated after the election of the Popular Front.

Sport
7 July – Tour de France begins.
2 August – Tour de France ends, won by Sylvère Maes of Belgium.

Births
15 February – Jean-Gabriel Albicocco, film director (died 2001)
23 February – Roger Rivière, cyclist (died 1976)
12 April – Jean-Claude Vrinat, restaurateur (died 2008)
1 March – Jean-Edern Hallier, author (died 1997)
7 March – Georges Perec, novelist, filmmaker and essayist (died 1982)
1 May – Danièle Huillet, filmmaker (died 2006)
20 June – Jean-Daniel Pollet, film director and screenwriter (died 2004)
1 August – Yves Saint Laurent, fashion designer (died 2008)
4 August – Claude Ballot-Léna, motor racing driver (died 1999)
12 October – Pascale Audret, actress (died 2000)
28 December – Jacques Mesrine, gangster (died 1979)

Deaths
7 January – Guy d'Hardelot, composer, pianist and teacher (born 1858)
5 February – Charles le Bargy, actor and film director (born 1858)
28 February – Charles Nicolle, bacteriologist who won the 1928 Nobel Prize in Medicine (born 1866)
16 March – Marguerite Durand, actress, journalist and suffragette (born 1864)
23 May – Henri de Régnier, poet (born 1864)
13 June – Marie-Louise Bouglé, feminist, librarian, and archivist (born 1883)
15 July – Charles Binet, Archbishop of Besançon and cardinal (born 1869)
1 August – Louis Blériot, inventor, engineer and aviation pioneer (born 1872)
23 August – Juliette Adam, writer (born 1836)
17 October – Suzanne Bianchetti, actress (born 1889)

Full date unknown
Georges Garnier, soccer player (born 1878)

See also
 List of French films of 1936
Interwar France

References

1930s in France